The River Don is a river in north-east Scotland. It rises in the Grampians and flows eastwards, through Aberdeenshire, to the North Sea at Aberdeen. The Don passes through Alford, Kemnay, Inverurie, Kintore, and Dyce. Its main tributary, the River Ury, joins at Inverurie.

Course of the river
The Don rises in the peat flat beneath Druim na Feithe, and in the shadow of Glen Avon, before flowing quietly past the ice-age moraine and down to Cock Bridge, below the picturesque site of the recently demolished Delnadamph Lodge. Several streams, the Dhiver, Feith Bhait, Meoir Veannaich, Cock Burn and the Allt nan Aighean merge to form the embryonic Don. Water from the north of Brown Cow Hill drains into the Don, while water from the west side runs into the River Spey and that from the south side into the Dee. The Don follows a circuitous route eastwards past Corgarff Castle, through Strathdon and the Howe of Alford before entering the North Sea just north of Old Aberdeen.

The chief tributaries are Conrie Water, Ernan Water, Water of Carvie, Water of Nochty, Deskry Water, Water of Buchat, Kindy Burn, Bucks Burn, Mossat Burn, Leochel Burn and the River Ury.

History
The river was recorded by the 2nd century AD cosmographer Ptolemy of Alexandria (d. c 168) as Δηουανα Devona, meaning 'goddess', an indication the river was once a sacred one. Near Kintore, not distant from the Don, is the Deers Den Roman Camp. In 1750 the Don's lower reaches were channelled towards the sea, moving its confluence with the sea northwards.

Hydrology

River levels and flows have been measured along the course of the Don at a number of gauging stations since 1969. The station measures 97% of the total  catchment of the river.

The resultant flooding forced residents along the river to evacuate their homes, in some cases with the help of local rescue teams. Areas affected included Port Elphinstone, Kintore, and Donside in Aberdeen where a number of residential care homes were evacuated as a precaution.

Economy
Strathdon attracts visitors for salmon and trout fishing as well as its castles and scenery.

See also
Aberdeenshire Canal
Brig o' Balgownie
Glenbuchat Castle 
List of rivers of Scotland
Rivers and Fisheries Trusts of Scotland (RAFTS)
List of navigation authorities in the United Kingdom
List of waterway societies in the United Kingdom

References

External links 

Fishing the Fly
Fish-Wild!
The River Don Trust

Don
Don